The 32nd Regiment Illinois Volunteer Infantry was an infantry regiment that served in the Union Army during the American Civil War.

Service
The 32nd Illinois Infantry was organized at Camp Butler, Illinois and mustered into Federal service on December 31, 1861.

The regiment was mustered out on September 16, 1865, at Fort Leavenworth, Kansas.

Total strength and casualties
The regiment suffered 8 officers and 90 enlisted men who were killed in action or who died of their wounds and 3 officer and 168 enlisted men who died of disease, for a total of 268 fatalities.

Commanders
Colonel John Logan
Lieutenant Colonel George H. English - Mustered out with the regiment.
Lieutenant Colonel William Hunter

See also
List of Illinois Civil War Units
Illinois in the American Civil War

Notes

References
The Civil War Archive

Units and formations of the Union Army from Illinois
1861 establishments in Illinois
Military units and formations established in 1861
Military units and formations disestablished in 1865